Viktoria Rebensburg (born 4 October 1989) is a German retired World Cup alpine ski racer and the 2010 Olympic gold medalist in the  Born in Tegernsee, Bavaria, she has three World Cup season titles, all in giant slalom.

Career
After finishing 28th in the Olympic super-G, she won gold in the giant slalom, her first victory in international competition. Her previous best finish was second place at a GS a month earlier, her only World Cup podium.

Eight months later, Rebensberg won her first World Cup race in October 2010, a giant slalom in the season opener at Sölden, Austria. She won two more GS races during the 2011 season and took the giant slalom season title; she finished eighth in the overall standings, won by teammate Maria Riesch. In the 2012 season she won five races – four GS and one super-G – and went on to defend the GS season title.

On 1 September 2020, she announced her retirement from alpine skiing due to unsuccessful comeback after latest injury.

World Cup results

Season titles
 3 titles – (3 GS)

Season standings

Race victories
 19 wins – (14 GS, 4 SG, 1 DH)
 49 podiums – (34 GS, 8 SG,  7 DH)

World Championship results

Olympic results

References

External links
 
 
 – 
Ski Team (DSV) – Viktoria Rebensburg – 

1989 births
German female alpine skiers
Alpine skiers at the 2010 Winter Olympics
Alpine skiers at the 2014 Winter Olympics
Alpine skiers at the 2018 Winter Olympics
Olympic alpine skiers of Germany
Medalists at the 2010 Winter Olympics
Medalists at the 2014 Winter Olympics
Olympic medalists in alpine skiing
Olympic gold medalists for Germany
Olympic bronze medalists for Germany
FIS Alpine Ski World Cup champions
People from Miesbach (district)
Sportspeople from Upper Bavaria
Living people
21st-century German women